Schtonk! (subtitled Der Film zum Buch vom Führer; "The film accompanying the Führer's book") is a 1992 German satirical film which retells the story of the 1983 Hitler Diaries hoax. It was written and directed by Helmut Dietl.

Background

In 1983, the German magazine Stern began to publish the purported Hitler diaries with great fanfare. They were soon proven to be fake using basic analysis techniques.

Co-writer and director Helmut Dietl researched the scandal for two years and was quoted as having to leave out several real events from the film because they were too outrageous. The title is a bow to Charlie Chaplin's classic The Great Dictator, in which the Tomainian dictator Adenoid Hynkel repeatedly uses "Schtonk!" as an expression of disgustthe word has no meaning in German.

Plot 
Fritz Knobel (the film's alter-ego of real-life forger Konrad Kujau) supports himself by faking and selling Nazi memorabilia. He sells a portrait of Eva Braun and one volume of Hitler's alleged diaries to factory owner Karl Lenz. Lenz presents this to his guests during a "birthday party for the Führer", among whom is sleazy journalist Hermann Willié. Willié works for the magazine "HH press", which links to Hamburg (as a licence plate abbreviation), where the Stern magazine is located and also to the common abbreviation for "Heil Hitler" among neo-Nazis. Knobel writes the subsequent diaries based on what happens around him; after he meets Martha and she becomes his lover beside his wife Biggi, she also becomes his inspiration for Eva Braun in the diaries. The rumors about his work cause a major Nazi craze among the high society, allowing former Nazi officials to use openly their Nazi ranks (e.g. Obergruppenführer). Willié becomes even more obsessed buying the old yacht Carin II of Hermann Göring and starting an affair with his (fictional) grandniece Freya von Hepp, based on Hermann Göring's daughter Edda Göring.

Towards the end, the plot has developed its own dynamics, putting more and more pressure on Knobel to deliver the remaining volumes while permanently fearing the uncovering of the forgery. The volumes are convincing enough to fool the enthusiastic journalists, who are willing to overlook some oddities, especially a false monogram "FH" instead of "AH" on one of the volumes. They even invent alternative facts for their explanation (the term "Führerhauptquartier" instead of "Adolf Hitler" for instance). Later Knobel manages to manipulate a forensic graphoanalysis to his advance but it seems only a matter of time until the truth is discovered. The constant fear and the struggle with a too close identification with the person he is writing about make Knobel collapse. His two spouses take over the initiative forcing him to pull himself out of the forgery business just in time, while the others fall, similar to the end of World War II, more or less hard according to their personal level of belief.

Cast 
 Götz GeorgeHermann Willié (journalist; fictional equivalent of Gerd Heidemann)
 Uwe OchsenknechtFritz Knobel (forger Konrad Kujau)
 Christiane HörbigerFreya von Hepp (Hermann Göring's grandniece, Willié's/Heidemann's noble girl friend)
 Dagmar ManzelBiggi
 Veronica FerresMartha 
 Ulrich MüheDr. Wieland 
 Harald JuhnkePit Kummer 
 Hermann LauseKurt Glück
 Martin BenrathUwe Esser
 Rosemarie FendelMrs. Lentz

Reception
The film was a huge hit in Germany but performed badly in many other territories.

Awards 
In 1992, Schtonk! won three awards at the German Film Awards in the categories "Outstanding Feature Film", "Outstanding Individual Achievement: Actor" (Götz George) and "Outstanding Individual Achievement: Direction" (Helmut Dietl), as well as the Best Screenplay Award at the Tokyo International Film Festival (Helmut Dietl, Ulrich Limmer).

In 1993, Harald Juhnke won the Ernst Lubitsch Award for his role as Pit Kummer.

Schtonk! was nominated for an Academy Award and a Golden Globe in the category of "Best Foreign Language Film" in 1993, losing to the French film Indochine in both cases.

References

External links 
 

1992 films
1990s satirical films
German comedy films
1990s German-language films
German films based on actual events
Films set in Hamburg
Films set in West Germany
Films about con artists
Films about journalists
Comedy films based on actual events
Films à clef
Films about hoaxes
1990s German films